The Poetry Association of Scotland (or PAS), formerly known as the Scottish Association for the Speaking of Verse, is a public, membership-based literary society founded in 1924 principally by John Masefield (along with other figures such as Marion Angus and Hugh MacDiarmid).

In its present form, the Association, which is a registered charity, runs an annual series of monthly poetry readings featuring invited poets from both Scottish and international circuits, as well as regular talks on poetry-related topics by distinguished speakers, including its biennial Hugh MacDiarmid Lecture. The Association's events in recent years have generally, though not exclusively, been held in the Scottish Poetry Library in Edinburgh.

Although a single-tier organisation today, in past decades the Association had multiple area branches throughout Scotland.

Post-holders past and present

The following comprises only a partial and non-consecutive list of most recent names:

Honorary presidents

Douglas Dunn (present)
Edwin Morgan
Norman MacCaig
Hugh MacDiarmid

Chair

Joyce Caplan (present) 
Norman Kreitman
Peter France

Secretaries

Mario Relich (present)
Robin Bell 
Deric Bolton

External links
 Poetry Association of Scotland website

Poetry organizations
Charities based in Scotland
Scottish poetry
British writers' organisations